The Battle of Faggeta was fought in Ethiopia at Faggeta Lekoma on 9 December 1769. Ras Mikael Sehul, Emperor Tekle Haymanot II and Wand Bewossen fought and defeated Fasil of Damount in a large, costly battle. Tekle Haymanot is said to have camped at Dengel Ber on his march south against Fasil.

References 

Faggeta 
Battles of the Zemene Mesafint
1769 in Ethiopia
1769 in Africa
Faggeta
18th century in Ethiopia